Dancing with the Stars returned for a third series on 6 January 2019 on RTÉ One for a twelve-week run.

Nicky Byrne returned as host for a third year, joined by Jennifer Zamparelli who replaces Amanda Byram as co-host.

Brian Redmond, Loraine Barry and Julian Benson all returned as judges.

Couples
On 2 December 2018, Mairéad Ronan, was officially announced as the first celebrity to be taking part. Celebrity reveals then continued every day until 7 December when the final three contestants were revealed during an appearance on The Late Late Show.

On 26 December 2018, professional dancer Curtis Pritchard was involved in an incident where he and his brother, AJ Pritchard, were attacked in a nightclub by eight people. Curtis sustained injuries to his face, eye and knee. Because of the attack, Curtis was forced to undergo surgery on his knee, he was therefore ruled out of taking part in the series until further notice. It was confirmed he would be replaced by a new professional dancer. On 4 January 2019, Curtis' replacement was confirmed as being former Strictly Come Dancing professional dancer Trent Whiddon. The rest of the pairings were revealed later that day on the pre-show, Can't Stop Dancing. Scoring chart 

 Red numbers indicate the couples with the lowest score for each week.
 Green numbers indicate the couples with the highest score for each week.
  the couple eliminated that week
  the returning couple that was called forward and eventually last to be called safe, but was not necessarily in the bottom
  the returning couple that finished in the bottom two and competed in the Dance-Off
  the winning couple
  the runner-up couple

 Average chart 
This table only counts for single dances scored on a traditional 30-points scale. It does not include the Team Dance or Marathon scores.

 Highest and lowest scoring performances 
The highest and lowest performances in each dance according to the judges' scale are as follows.

 Couples' highest and lowest scoring dances 

 Weekly scores and songs Unless indicated otherwise, individual judges scores in the charts below (given in parentheses) are listed in this order from left to right: Brian Redmond, Loraine Barry, Julian Benson. Week 1 
Guest act: Series 2 champions, Jake Carter and Karen Byrne performing a Contemporary Ballroom to 'Sign of the Times'

 Running order (Men)

 Week 2 
Guest act: Ryan Mack performing ‘Sofa’.

 Running order (Women)

 Week 3 

 Running order

 Week 4: Movie Week 

 Running order

 Week 5: Most Memorable Year Week 

 Running order

 Week 6: Switch-Up Week 
Guest act: Wild Youth performing ‘Making Me Dance’.

 Running order

 Week 7 Individual judges scores in the charts below (given in parentheses) are listed in this order from left to right: Brian Redmond, Loraine Barry, Darren Bennett.Due to an illness, Darren Bennett filled in for Julian Benson for the night.

 Running order

Dance-Off

Judges' votes to save

 Bennett: Fred & Giulia
 Redmond: Fred & Giulia
 Barry: Did not vote, but would have voted to save Fred & Giulia Week 8: Orchestra Week Individual judges scores in the charts below (given in parentheses) are listed in this order from left to right: Brian Redmond, Loraine Barry, Darren Bennett.Darren Bennett filled in for Julian Benson.

All performances this week are accompanied by the RTÉ Concert Orchestra.

 Running order

Dance-Off

Judges' votes to save

 Bennett: Clelia & Vitali
 Redmond: Clelia & Vitali
 Barry: Did not vote, but would have voted to save Clelia & Vitali Week 9: Team Dance Week 
Julian Benson returned to the panel following a two-week absence.

After each couple performed their individual dance, all six couples were separated into two teams to perform a team dance to earn a higher individual scores.

 Running order

Dance-Off

Judges' votes to save

 Benson: Clelia & Vitali
 Redmond: Denis & Valeria
 Barry: Clelia & Vitali

 Week 10: Eurovision Week 
After each couple performed their individual dance, all five couples took to the floor for the "Eurothon" in a bid to increase their scores.

Guest act: Johnny Logan performing "Hold Me Now" and Sarah McTernan performing '22'.

 Running order

Dance-Off

Judges' votes to save

 Benson: Fred & Giulia
 Redmond: Clelia & Vitali
 Barry: Fred & Giulia

 Week 11: St. Patrick's Day The couples will perform two dances, the first being a song by an Irish artist to celebrate Saint Patrick's Day.Guest act: Walking on Cars performing 'Coldest Water'.

 Running order

Dance-OffFor the dance-off Johnny & Emily chose to perform their Paso Doble, while Fred & Giulia chose their Salsa.

Judges' votes to save

 Benson: Johnny & Emily
 Redmond: Johnny & Emily
 Barry: Did not vote, but would have voted to save Johnny & Emily''

Week 12: The Final 
Guest act: Westlife performing 'Hello My Love'.

 Running order

Dance chart 

  Highest scoring dance
  Lowest scoring dance
  No dance performed

References

External links
 Official website

Season 03
2019 Irish television seasons